Now It Can Be Played is an album by guitarist John Abercrombie and pianist Andy LaVerne recorded in 1992 and released on the Danish label, SteepleChase.

Reception 

Ken Dryden of AllMusic stated, "This is a fine date that is filled with many interesting twists".

Track listing 
All compositions by Andy LaVerne except where noted.

 "Now It Can Be Played" – 7:44
 "I Wish I Knew" (Harry Warren, Mack Gordon) – 8:27
 "Shadow and Fog" – 8:30
 "John's Waltz" (John Abercrombie) – 7:30
 "Cat Nap" – 9:06
 "Yesterdays" (Jerome Kern, Otto Harbach) – 8:05
 "Labour Day" (Abercrombie) – 7:55
 "Waltz King" – 9:09

Personnel 
John Abercrombie – guitar
Andy LaVerne – piano
Steve LaSpina – bass
Jeff Hirschfield – drums

References 

 

John Abercrombie (guitarist) albums
Andy LaVerne albums
1993 albums
SteepleChase Records albums